The R376 is a Regional Route in South Africa that connects the N18 at Setlagole to the south-east with the R375 to the north-west.

References

Regional Routes in North West (South African province)